Salem Township is one of the twelve townships of Champaign County, Ohio, United States. The 2010 census reported 2,539 people living in the township, 2,382 of whom lived in the unincorporated portions of the township.

Geography
Located in the northern part of the county, it borders the following townships:
Liberty Township, Logan County - north
Monroe Township, Logan County - northeast
Wayne Township - east
Union Township - southeast
Urbana Township - south
Mad River Township - southwest corner
Concord Township - west
Harrison Township - northwest

A small part of the city of Urbana, the county seat of Champaign County, is located in the southern part of the township, and the unincorporated community of Kennard lies in the township's east. The Ohio Caverns are located in the northeastern part of the township, near the Logan County line.

Name and history
It is one of fourteen Salem Townships statewide.

Salem Township was established in 1805 as one of the first townships in Champaign County.

A historic site in the township is Mount Tabor Methodist Episcopal Church.  Built in 1881, it is listed on the National Register of Historic Places.

Government
The township is governed by a three-member board of trustees, who are elected in November of odd-numbered years to a four-year term beginning on the following January 1. Two are elected in the year after the presidential election and one is elected in the year before it. There is also an elected township fiscal officer, who serves a four-year term beginning on April 1 of the year after the election, which is held in November of the year before the presidential election. Vacancies in the fiscal officership or on the board of trustees are filled by the remaining trustees.

Education
West Liberty-Salem High School is located in Salem Township.

References

External links
County website
County and township map of Ohio

Townships in Champaign County, Ohio
Townships in Ohio